Yangju is a city in Gyeonggi Province, South Korea.  Yangju is located south of Dongducheon and north of Uijeongbu, not far from Seoul.

History 
 1395 - Renamed to Yangju.
 January 1, 1963 - Uijeongbu is separated and becomes a city.
 April 1, 1980 - Namyangju is separated and becomes a city.
 July 1, 1981 - Dongducheon is separated and becomes a city.

Attractions
Yangju is home to the Jangheun Art Gallery, which features six exhibition halls and includes subsidiary facilities such as outdoor performances and outdoor sculptures.  Yangju also has an astronomical observatory and planetarium that is open to the public. The city also used to have a walking Dae Jang Geum Theme Park featuring the film locations and constructed sets for the MBC Korean drama Daejanggeum, but this was closed permanently in late 2011 due to persistent vandalism.

Yangju also hosts the yearly Yangju Snow Festival. The city has a few mountains, including Gamaksan and Bulgoksan, which can be hiked. Part of Bukhansan is located within Yangju.

Town
It is divided into Okjeong New City and Hoecheon New City.

Okjeong City consists of Okjeong Village, Yuljeong Village, Hoeam Village, Wow Village, Cheonbosan Village, and Dokbawigol.

Okjeong new city
In the beginning, the correct name was Okjeong-gu, Yangjin City, but the LH removed the name Yangjin-city to reflect the opinions of residents, and Okjeong-gu was called Okjeong-si, and Hoecheon-si was called Hoecheon New Town. It is being sold under the name of the city of Okshin City.
It claims to be a pleasant new town with a green area ratio of 26.88% where a high-tech city and clean nature harmonize.
Okjeong and Hoecheon With a population of 160,000, the target population of 41,481 households is 106,000. As of March 2021, 17 complexes (Sechang Libe House, LH Millennial Tree 7BL, LH Millennial Tree 13BL, Okjeong Central Park Prugio, LH Millennium Tree 8BL, LH Millennium Tree 16BL, ePyeonhansesang Okjeong Urban Central, ePyeonhansesang Okjeong Edu Summit, Regencyville Land, LH Happy House 3BL, Kumho/GS Jadewell, ePyunhansang Okjeong The First, Gyeryong/Taeyoung The Park Foret, Seyoung Richel Lake Park, ePyunhansang Okjeong Metro Foret, Nobleland The Signature, Moa Miraedo Parkview [3]) has been completed / moved in, and the resident population has exceeded 50,000 (as of February 10, 2021).

Currently 8 complexes (A11 Jungheung Centum City, A20-1 Yurim Norwegian Forest, A10-1, A10-2 Cheil Gyeongbokgung Chae, A4-2 Daebang 2nd, A2 Daebang 3rd, A17-1 Daesung Berhill, A17-2 Hanshin Thehue), A23 The1 Park Village) is under construction, and the blocks scheduled for sale after 2021 are A1 (Umi, Shindong-A public sale), A24 (Daelim public sale), A5 (Gyeryong public support private rental), A25 (Happy housing/national rental), A4-1 (public sale in Gyeryong), and A19-2 (private lease with public support) remain.

Okjeong Lake Park
Okjeong Lake Park is a lake park that has been completed since the development of Yangshuo City in 2007 . There are facilities such as a fountain facility, an outdoor stage, and a lake observatory.

Climate
Yangju has a monsoon-influenced humid continental climate (Köppen: Dwa) with cold, dry winters and hot, rainy summers.

Transportation
There are three subway stations covered by the Seoul Metropolitan Subway, and it takes about 70 minutes from the center of Seoul
to the first station located in Yangju.
Also, there are numerous public bus services running between Seoul, Uijeongbu, and up to Yeoncheon, where the border with North Korea
is crossed by the Demilitarized Military Zone.

Railroad 
Korail (Seoul Subway Line 1)
 Deokjeong station
 Deokgye station
 Yangju station

Bus 
 City Bus: Yangju City Bus, Yangju Village Bus
 Intercity Bus: Yangju Intercity Bus Station

Road 
Highway
 Seoul Ring Expressway: Songchu IC, Sapsan Tunnel
 Sejong–Pocheon Expressway: Okjeong IC, Yangju IC
 Highway Route No. 400

Route
 National Route 3, National Route 39

Local Roads
 Local Route 39, Local Route 56, Local Route 78, Local Route 98
 Local Route 360, Local Route 364, Local Route 367, Local Route 371, Local Route 379

Sister Cities
  - Eunpyeong District, Seoul
  - Henrico County, Virginia
  - Dongying, Shandong
  - Fujieda, Shizuoka

Notable people from Yangju
 Lee Seung-hyung (Hangul: 이승형), South Korean actor.

Statistics

See also
List of cities in South Korea
Yangju highway incident
Yangju Citizen FC

References

External links

City government website
회정역 파밀리에

 

 
Cities in Gyeonggi Province